Ido Marang (19 December 1918 – 24 May 1970) was a French field hockey player. He competed in the men's tournament at the 1960 Summer Olympics.

References

External links
 

1918 births
1970 deaths
French male field hockey players
Olympic field hockey players of France
Field hockey players at the 1960 Summer Olympics